Beverley Friary (also known as The Old Friary) is a row of buildings in Beverley, East Riding of Yorkshire, England.  The buildings are a Grade II* listed building that since 1984 have been used as a youth hostel. They are thought to be either part of an old Dominican friary, or to have been built on the site of the friary using stone from the site.

History of the friary
A Dominican friary was first established in Beverley , according to other sources already in 1210. The Dominican order were given an area of land close to Beverley Minster by the Archbishop of York who was the lord of Beverley.  On this site the Blackfriars (as the Dominican order were often known due to the colour of their cowls) built their first friary; probably of timber until the cost of stone could be afforded.

As the community flourished and money became available, the friary was extended and in the early 14th century and extension to the south west of the cloister saw the construction of a building to accommodate guests was built and it is the foundations of this building that provide the footings for the present day buildings.

By the end of the 14th century the friary was at its maximum extent and the next 150 years saw a gradual decline in the fortunes of the friary and a contraction in the use of the buildings.

In 1539 the Dissolution of the Monasteries had entered a second round of dissolutions and the remaining friars were expelled in that year and the property wrecked. Many of the buildings were simply pulled down and much of the material used elsewhere although the guesthouse is thought to have escaped demolition because it was not being used directly for religious purposes. An alternative theory for the existence of the current buildings is that they were constructed on the site of the guesthouse using materials recovered from elsewhere within the friary.

History since Dissolution
In 1544 the guesthouse was sold to John Pope and Anthony Foster. At some later date it was sold again to the Wharton family and later to Earls of Yarborough and in 1826 was acquired by Richard Whiteing whose family continued to own part of the property until 1960. The remainder of the friary was used for a variety of purposes but in the 19th century much of it was built over by the building of the railway between Hull and Bridlington. The guesthouse became, during the 19th century, three separate dwelling houses, numbers 7, 9 and 11 Friary Lane and continued this use until the 1960s. At this time ownership passed to Armstrong Patents Co ltd who owned the adjacent factory and in 1962 Armstrong's applied for permission to demolish the buildings. Permission was refused and the houses made the subject of a preservation order with preservation work commencing in 1974.

The buildings are now owned by East Riding of Yorkshire Council who maintain the buildings with the assistance of the Beverley Friary Preservation Trust. In 1984 the buildings were rented to YHA (England and Wales) who have operated a youth hostel on the site since.

Construction

The buildings are a mix of brick and stone construction and stands on the stone footings of one of the earlier friary buildings. Some of the brickwork exhibits a diaper pattern using sunken bricks. The roof is tiled and the internal partition walls are timber framed. Within the westernmost building a number of painted wall plasters dating from about the time of the Dissolution were discovered during the restoration work. A panelled room in the building is dated to the late 16th or early 17th century.

References

Notes

Sources

Grade II* listed buildings in the East Riding of Yorkshire
Beverley
Youth hostels in England and Wales
Dominican monasteries in England
Monasteries in the East Riding of Yorkshire